The West Virginia Black Bears are a collegiate summer baseball team of the MLB Draft League. They are located in Granville, West Virginia, and play their home games at Monongalia County Ballpark, which is across the Monongahela River from Morgantown and West Virginia University. From 2015 to 2020, they were a Minor League Baseball team of the New York–Penn League. They were the Class A Short Season affiliate of the Pittsburgh Pirates from their inception until MLB's reorganization of the minors after the 2020 season.

In August 2014, it was announced that the Jamestown Jammers would cease operations and move to Morgantown. On October 22, the team announced that they would be named the "Black Bears" following a fan vote, as the American black bear is the state animal of West Virginia. Other finalists included Black Diamonds, Canaries, Coal Kings, Coal Sox, Energy, Moonshiners, Muskets, Wild Ones, and Wonder.

In January 2015, Wyatt Toregas was named as their inaugural manager. The Black Bears won the New York–Penn League wild card in their inaugural season. The team then defeated the Williamsport Crosscutters and the Staten Island Yankees to win the 2015 New York–Penn League Championship.  On February 24, 2022, Leighann Sainato was named General Manager.

Roster

Season-by-season record

MLB Draft League

References

External links

Baseball teams established in 2015
MLB Draft League teams
New York–Penn League teams
Professional baseball teams in West Virginia
Sports in Morgantown, West Virginia
Pittsburgh Pirates minor league affiliates
2015 establishments in West Virginia